The Geological Museum is a component of the Natural History Museum in London, established in 1835.

Geological Museum may also refer to:
A natural history museum 
Geological Museum (Budapest)
Geological Museum (Malaysia)
The original name of the Western Australian Museum, Perth

Geology Museum may refer to:
Geology Museum (Romania)

See also
List of natural history museums
:Category:Geology museums